Dob is a Slovene toponym, found in Slovenia, Austria and Italy. It derives from a Proto-Slavic word dǫbъ (oak). The word dob is today used exclusively for Quercus robur (Slovene: dob), as other oak species have progressively taken other names. Toponyms having their root in the word "dob" are sometimes hard to distinguish from other similar Slovene words —— particularly dober, and dobra (English: good), which can be used to refer to many other types of places.

Slovenia

Villages 
 Dob, Domžale, village in central Slovenia
 Dob pri Šentvidu, village in the Municipality of Ivančna Gorica in central Slovenia.

Hamlets 
 Dob, a hamlet of Slovenska Vas

Austria

Villages 
 Dob (German: Aich), (Municipality Bleiburg, Carinthia)
 Dob (German: Aich), (Municipality Velden am Wörther See, Carinthia)

Italy

Villages 
 Doberdob (Italian: Doberdò del Lago), (Province of Gorizia, Friuli-Venezia Giulia) - meaning good (dober) oak.

Toponyms and microtoponyms with the word dob as their root

Slovenia 
 Dobe
 Dobenje
 Dobeno
 Doberdob
 Dobindol
 Dobinje
 Dobje
 Doblar
 Dobležiče
 Dobliče
 Dobličica
 Dobova
 Dobovci
 Dobovec
 Dobovica
 Dobovlje
 Dobrava
 Dobravica
 Dobravka
 Dobravlje
 Dobravšce
 Dobrča
 Dobrla
 Dobrljevo
 Dobrova
 Dobrovce
 Dobrovec
 Dobrovlje
 Dobrovnik
 Dobrovo
 Dobrovščak
 Dobrunje
 Dobruša

Austria

Villages 
 Dobajna/Dobein (Municipality Keutschach am See, Carinthia)
 Dobajnica/Dobeinitz (Municipality Keutschach am See, Carinthia)
 Dobje/Aich (Municipality Grafenstein, Carinthia)
 Dobrawa (Kärnten / Völkermarkt)
 Dobrawa (Kärnten / Villach Land/ Hohenthurn)
 Dobrawa (Kärnten / Villach Land/ Arnoldstein)
 Dobrova/Dobrowa (Municipality Ruden, Völkermarkt, Cainthia
 Dobrova/Dobrowa (Municipality Bleiburg, Carinthia)
 Dobrova/Dobrowa (Municipality St. Margareten im Rosental, Carinthia)
 Dobrova/Hart (Municipality Eberndorf)
 Dobrova/hart (Municipality Sittersdorf, Carinthia)
 Dobrowa (Municipality Völkermarkt)

Microtoponyms 
 Dobrava mountain near Arnoldstein, Carinthia
 Dobrava (forest near Villach, Carinthia)
 Dobrava (forest near Wildenstein, Carinthia)
 Dobrava (forest in Mittlern, Carinthia)

Italia

Villages 
 Dobbia (Staranzano, Friuli-Venezia Giulia)
 Dobie (San Pietro al Natisone,  Friuli-Venezia Giulia)

Hamlets 
 Stallo Dobrave (Chiusaforte / Friuli-Venezia Giulia)

Croatia 
 Dobovec (Cvetlin, Municipality Bednja, Varaždinska županija)
 Gornja Dubrava - former Dobrava (Gornji Mihaljevec, Međimurska županija)
 Donja Dubrava - former Dobrava (Međimurska županija)

Slavic toponyms